Luc Granitur (born January 12, 2003) is an American soccer player who plays for North Florida Ospreys.

Career

Youth 
At the age of 13, Granitur joined Orlando City's academy system. At the U-15 level, he had a breakout season, scoring 33 goals in 32 matches with Orlando City's U-15 team in the U.S. Soccer Development Academy League. Grantiur began receiving national attention by colleges by his sophomore year of high school, being listed as the 20th best recruit in the nation by CollegeSoccerNews.com.

Club 
Granitur signed his first professional contract on November 16, 2018 with Orlando City B, the reserve side of his parent club, Orlando City. On March 30, 2019, Granitur made his debut for Orlando City B in a 1-3 loss against FC Tucson. Granitur came on as a substitute for Will Bagrou in the 76th minute.

International 
Granitur has been invited into training camps with the United States men's national under-17 soccer team.

References

External links 
 

2003 births
Living people
American soccer players
Association football forwards
Orlando City B players
People from Vero Beach, Florida
Soccer players from Florida
United States men's youth international soccer players
USL League One players
North Carolina Tar Heels men's soccer players
North Florida Ospreys men's soccer players